Sedition is the second album released by New Zealand death metal band Dawn of Azazel. It was released in October, 2005 in New Zealand, on Extreme Imprints. It was also released in United States and Europe in 2006 on Ibex Moon Records. It was the first studio album to feature Martin Cavanagh on drums.

Track listing 
 Spare None – 3:23
 Swathed in Impurity – 3:19
 The Road to Babalon – 2:42
 Descent into Eminence – 4:17
 Villainy Endures – 2:44
 Sedition – 3:07
 Violence and Uncleanliness – 2:10
 Sin (Amongst the Kings) – 4:20
 Master of the Strumpets – 3:05

Personnel 
 Rigel Walshe – vocals, bass guitar
 Joe Bonnett – guitar
 Martin Cavanagh – drums

2005 albums
Dawn of Azazel albums